Ocean Gateway Pier II is a floating deepwater cruise ship pier located at the Ocean Gateway International Marine Passenger Terminal in Portland, Maine.

Construction of the pier began on 1 November 2010 with a groundbreaking ceremony attended by Maine governor John Baldacci and city officials.  It was opened on 10 September 2011, when Enchantment of the Seas became the first vessel to dock at the pier.

The total cost of building the pier was about $6 million, paid for by a state transportation bond.

The pier is composed of a  floating barge, anchored to the seabed, at the center of the structure for embarking passengers onto ships, with the remainder a gangway wide enough to accommodate vehicles the size of a golf cart. The gangway is supported by individual pilings and clusters of three pilings.

References

Transportation in Portland, Maine
Buildings and structures in Portland, Maine
Transportation buildings and structures in Cumberland County, Maine